Fernando Eimbcke (born 1970 in Mexico City) is a Mexican film director and screenwriter.

Fernando Eimbcke studied film direction at the Centro Universitario de Estudios Cinematográficos of the UNAM (1992–1996). He started his career directing music videoclips and short films. His feature debut in Mexican cinema was the 2004 Temporada de patos (Duck Season), which won several Film Festival awards including the Ariel Award for Best Film.  His next film, the 2008 Lake Tahoe, was received positively at the Berlin International Film Festival, winning two awards.

Filmography
 Temporada de patos (2004)
 Perro que ladra  (2005)
 Lake Tahoe (2008)
 Club Sandwich (2013)
 Berlin, I Love You (2018)

Short films
 The Look of Love (2003)
 No sea malito (2003)
 La suerte de la fea... a la bonita no le importa (2002)
 No todo es permanente (1996)
 Disculpe las molestias (1994)
 Alcanzar una estrella (1993)

Awards

Primer Concurso Nacional De Proyectos De Cortometraje
 The First National Contest of Short Film Project
 La suerte de la fea… a la bonita no le importa

MTV Movie Awards Mexico

Nominations
2001
 Favorite Video ("Video de la gente", or The people's video) for his video for Genitallica
 Favorite Video for his videos for Jumbo
 Favorite Video for his video for Plastilina Mosh (1998)

AFI Fest - 2004 
Won Grand Jury Prize
 For Temporada de patos

Ariel Award - 2005

Silver Ariel
 Best Director (Mejor Dirección)
 For Temporada de patos
 Best First Work - Fiction (Mejor Ópera Prima Ficcón)
 For Temporada de patos
 Best Screenplay Written Directly for the Screen (Mejor Guión Cinematográfico Original)
  For Temporada de patos

Nominations 
 Best short film
 For No todo es permanente

Guadalajara Film Festival

FIPRESCI Prize 
 For Temporada de patos

Mayahuel Award 
 Best Director
 For Temporada de patos
 Best Screenplay
 For Temporada de patos

Paris Film Festival 2005 
 Special Jury Prize
 For Temporada de patos

Nominated
 Grand Prix
 For Temporada de patos

Thessaloniki Film Festival 2004 
 Best Director
 For Temporada de patos

Nominated
 Golden Alexander
 For Temporada de patos

Valladolid International Film Festival 2004 
 Nominated Golden Spike
 For Temporada de patos

Berlin International Film Festival 2008

Nominated
Golden Berlin Bear
 For Lake Tahoe

Won
Alfred Bauer Prize
 For Lake Tahoe
FIPRESCI Prize
 For Lake Tahoe

San Sebastián International Film Festival 2013

Nominated
Golden Shell 
 For Club Sándwich

Won
Silver Shell for Best Director
 For Club Sándwich

References

External links
Profile at the International Film Festival Rotterdam site
Profile  at the Temporada de patos site

1970 births
Living people
Mexican screenwriters
Film directors from Mexico City
Writers from Mexico City
Best Director Ariel Award winners